Donald West "Don" Harward is an American philosopher who served as the sixth President of Bates College from March 1989 to November 2002, where he was succeeded by the first female president, Elaine Tuttle Hansen.

Early life and career 
Harward received his B.A. in mathematics from Maryville College, then his M.A. from American University, and Ph.D. in philosophy from the University of Maryland. Harward then taught at the University of Delaware and the College of Wooster, where he served as a dean and vice president of academic affairs.

On March 1, 1989, Harwad was tapped to succeed Thomas Hedley Reynolds as the sixth President of Bates College. His first years leading the college revolved around stressing the importance of egalitarian values and involvement in the community through the creation of a thesis program, and the strengthening of the study-abroad program. Overall, he would create 22 new programs available to students and faculty. He expanded the campus of Bates by constructing Pettengill Hall, the Residential Village, and the Bates College Coastal Center at Shortridge.

Harward stepped down from the Bates presidency on November 1, 2002. Three years later in 2005, The Harward Center for Community Partnerships was opened in Lewiston in his honor.

Harward currently serves as a senior advisor for the American Council on Education Fellows Program and a senior fellow with the American Association of American Colleges and Universities.

He received an honorary doctorate from Bates College on May 26, 2003.

Personal life 
He and his wife, Ann, have two children.

See also
History of Bates College
List of Bates College people

References

Further reading 
Bates College Mirror 2006 (Lewiston, ME: Bates College, 2006).

External links
Donald Harward bio
Harward Center

American philosophers
Maryville College alumni
American University alumni
University of Maryland, College Park alumni
Living people
Presidents of Bates College
University of Delaware faculty
Year of birth missing (living people)
College of Wooster faculty